The Rediffusion Tournament was a professional golf tournament played at La Moye Golf Club, Jersey from 1963 to 1966.

Winners

References

Golf tournaments in Jersey